The Big Six were the United Kingdom's largest retail suppliers of gas and electricity, who dominated the market following liberalisation in the late 1990s. By 2002, six companies – British Gas, EDF Energy, E.ON, RWE npower, ScottishPower and SSE – had emerged from the 15 former incumbent monopoly suppliers (the 14 regional public electricity suppliers and British Gas).

In 2008, the Big Six still had over 99% of domestic and small business customers. They were vertically integrated in electricity, owning sufficient generation capacity to supply all their customers; while in gas, only Centrica (British Gas) owned production facilities. By the third quarter of 2019, after efforts by the regulator Ofgem to promote competition, their combined share in Great Britain was 70% for electricity supply and 69% for gas. The purchase of SSE's retail business in January 2020 by OVO Energy, a competitor founded in 2009, marked the end of the original Big Six.

The companies 
Source:

2014–2016 competition investigation 
In June 2014, energy market regulator Ofgem referred the energy industry to the Competition and Markets Authority (CMA). The authority investigated the "six large energy firms" and published its report in June 2016. For the retail market, the report recommended:

 Removal of the requirement imposed by the 2014 Retail Market Review that limited suppliers to offering no more than four tariffs
 Establishment by Ofgem of a database of customers who have been on a "standard variable tariff" for three years or more, which competitors could use to contact those customers
 A temporary price cap for customers on prepayment meters
 Measures to support price comparison websites in the energy market.

Consolidation to Big Five  
In 2017, SSE and Npower announced a merger of their retail businesses, but this was scrapped in 2018.

Just after the failed SSE-Npower merger in late 2018, it was reported that a consolidation to the Big Five would still occur, as Npower would be acquired by default by E.ON due to the already-planned asset swap by the respective German parents, Innogy and E.ON. This was completed in 2019.

Alternatives to the Big Six
In December 2014, Utility Warehouse, part of FTSE 250-listed company Telecom Plus  became the UK's biggest independent energy supplier through a £218m deal to buy 770,000 existing customers from npower. In September 2014, First Utility  (since rebranded as Shell Energy) announced it was the first independent utility supplier to reach the milestone of 1m customer accounts for gas and electricity – the equivalent of 550,000 customers, which made it the seventh-largest energy supplier in the UK and the country's biggest independent energy provider. In June 2015, a Cornwall Report stated Opus Energy had broken the dominance of the 'Big Six' energy suppliers in the business market.

The Competition and Markets Authority published an investigation into the energy supply market in June 2016, following a referral by Ofgem in June 2014. The report identified 34 suppliers of both electricity and gas to households, and described the three largest suppliers outside the Big Six as "mid-tier suppliers"; these were First Utility, Ovo Energy and Utility Warehouse. Other significant suppliers (each with more than around 1% market share) were Co-operative Energy, Extra Energy and Utilita Energy (specialising in pre-pay customers). The combined market share of suppliers outside the Big Six had increased from less than 1% in 2011 to around 13% in the first quarter of 2016.

Since 2009, other entrants into the market include a number of new energy companies including Bulb Energy, Good Energy, Ecotricity, and Octopus Energy. Many of these newer entrants are seeing significant growth in customer numbers, in part due to their greater commitment to renewable energy and, in the case of Co-op Energy, community renewable energy projects.

The energy regulator Ofgem maintains a list of all licensed electricity suppliers and distribution network operators.

Local authority-owned companies 
Three of the alternative energy companies have been owned by local authorities. The first such company since 1948 was Robin Hood Energy, owned by Nottingham City Council, which entered the market in 2015. Bristol Energy, also launched in 2015, was owned by Bristol City Council. Both Robin Hood Energy and Bristol Energy were available to consumers throughout the country until their demise in 2020.

In January 2020, London Power was launched by the Mayor of London. Contrary to the other two companies, it only provides gas and electricity to London homes. London Power is not itself an energy supplier, instead it is a partnership between the Greater London Authority and a providing partner, currently Octopus Energy.

Defunct competitor companies

Before 2021
By January 2019, ten small energy suppliers had ceased trading or been taken over by others, and others followed similar paths until the market turbulence in the autumn of 2021.

2021–2022
Sharp increases in wholesale gas prices in summer and autumn 2021, and a consequent increase in wholesale electricity prices, led to further collapses. High prices continued into 2022. Ofgem continued to arrange for customers of those companies to be transferred to other suppliers, but when Bulb Energy failed in November 2021 a different approach was needed: with 1.7million customers, it was the seventh biggest supplier company. Bulb was placed in "special administration" and the UK government undertook to cover its losses while a sale or restructuring was organised, with a potential cost to taxpayers of £1.7billion.

See also 
Consumer Focus (consumer watchdog)
Energy in the United Kingdom
Energy policy of the United Kingdom
Energy switching services in the UK
Electricity sector in the United Kingdom

References